Luguru may refer to:
the Luguru people
the Luguru language